Rocky Trottier (born April 11, 1964) is a Canadian former professional ice hockey player who played 38 games in the National Hockey League (NHL) over two seasons with the New Jersey Devils.

Trottier, whose brother Bryan was part of the New York Islanders' dynasty of the early 1980s, was drafted by the then-unnamed New Jersey team with their first pick in the 1982 NHL Entry Draft; the former Colorado Rockies franchise had just relocated from Denver and had not yet announced a name. He was one of two New Jersey first-round picks in that draft; the other, Ken Daneyko, went on to play for the Devils for twenty seasons.

Professional career
Trottier made his NHL debut in 1983–84 season, appearing in five games and compiling one goal and one assist. He began the 1984–85 season with the Maine Mariners, of the American Hockey League (AHL), before being recalled by New Jersey. On December 17, 1984, during the Devils' 5–2 win at Brendan Byrne Arena, a penalty shot was awarded after Wayne Gretzky threw his stick in an attempt to stop Trottier's shot. This was the first penalty shot attempt and goal in the franchise history, coming against Edmonton Oilers goaltender Andy Moog. After a less-than-spectacular season, Trottier was sent back to Maine where he played two seasons before being released. Upon his release, Trottier signed a contract to play in the 2nd Bundesliga with EV Füssen. After one season in Germany, Trottier returned to the AHL to play with the Hershey Bears. At the end of the 1989–90 season, he retired from professional hockey.

Career statistics

References

External links
 

1964 births
Billings Bighorns players
Canadian expatriate ice hockey players in Sweden
Canadian ice hockey centres
Canadian Métis people
EV Füssen players
Hershey Bears players
Ice hockey people from Saskatchewan
Living people
Maine Mariners players
Medicine Hat Tigers players
Métis sportspeople
Nanaimo Islanders players
National Hockey League first-round draft picks
New Jersey Devils draft picks
New Jersey Devils players
Rögle BK players
Saskatoon Blades players
Wichita Wind players